= Thanedarwala railway station =

Railway station in Pakistan

Coordinates: 32.605131°N 71.122166°E

General information
- Owner: Ministry of Railways

Other information
- Station code: TWO

History
- Former names: Great Indian Peninsula Railway
Location

Thanedarwala railway station (Urdu: تھانیداروالا ریلوے اسٹیشن) is located in Pakistan.

== See also ==
- List of railway stations in Pakistan
- Pakistan Railways
